This List of ŠK Slovan Bratislava managers is about association football sport in Slovakia, for  ŠK Slovan Bratislava club.

Manager history

 
Slovan Bratislava
Slovan Bratislava